Chen Yunlin (born December 1941) was the chairman of the Association for Relations Across the Taiwan Straits (ARATS), the body responsible for negotiations with Taiwan in the People's Republic of China in 2008–2013.

Early life
Chen was born in 1941 in Heishan, Liaoning. He joined the Communist Party of China (CPC) in 1966. In 1967, he graduated from Beijing Agricultural University and started to work as technician in a chemical factory in Qiqihar, Heilongjiang, and later on promoted to be factory director.

Political life
In 1981, Chen started to work for the government as the Director of Qiqihar City Economic Planning Committee. In 1983, he became the mayor of Qiqihar and in 1984 he was appointed deputy secretary of the CPC provincial committee and Director of Commission for Restructuring the Economy of Heilongjiang Province. In 1987, he became the vice governor of Heilongjiang Province.

In 1994, he was appointed to the Taiwan Affairs Office of the State Council as vice director, becoming its director in 1997. In 2008, due to the resumption of talks with Taiwan following the election of Ma Ying-jeou, Chen Yun-lin became the second head of ARATS.

Though nominally a private body, ARATS is directly led by the Taiwan Affairs Office of the State Council. Chen's new office at ARATS is in the same building complex as his old office at the Taiwan Affairs Office. The ARATS is the body directly responsible for negotiating with the Strait Exchange Foundation (SEF), its  counterpart in Taiwan, which is correspondingly directly led by the Mainland Affairs Council of the Executive Yuan.

Visit to Taiwan

On November 4, 2008, Chen met with his Taiwanese counterpart at the Second Chen-Chiang summit. Chiang Pin-kung, head of Taiwan's SEF. It was the first ever meeting between ARATS and SEF leaders in Taiwan. The meeting lasted from November 3 to 7 in Taipei. The 5-day visit was the highest level meeting between the KMT and the CPC in six decades.  Another visit to Taiwan was followed on December 21, 2009.

This controversial visit triggered an important social movement called the Wild Strawberry student movement.

References

External links
Free searchable biography of Chen Yun-lin at China Vitae

1941 births
Living people
Chinese Communist Party politicians from Liaoning
Politicians from Jinzhou
People's Republic of China politicians from Liaoning